Sinclair Island is an island in the U.S. state of Washington. It is a part of, and lies off the western shore of mainland Skagit County. The island has a land area of 4.109 km2 (1.586 sq mi) and is home to only a few private residents.

The name Sinclair was given by Charles Wilkes during the Wilkes Expedition of 1838–1842. It honors Arthur Sinclair, who was captain of General Pike during a naval battle of the War of 1812.

Settlers in the 1890s referred to the island as Cottonwood Island, after the lumber harvested there for making barrel heads and staves.

Notes

References
Sinclair Island: Blocks 1029 thru 1036, Census Tract 9501, Skagit County, Washington United States Census Bureau

Islands of Washington (state)
Islands of Skagit County, Washington
Islands of Puget Sound